Berta Foersterová (née Lautererová, sometimes styled Bertha Laurer or Berta Foersterová-Lautererová; 11 January 1869 – 9 April 1936) was a Czech operatic soprano. She was active in Germany.

Biography
The wife of composer Josef Bohuslav Foerster, she met him while appearing at the Hamburg State Opera. She created the role of Desdemona in the Czech premiere of Giuseppe Verdi's Otello, and sang Tatiana in the Czech premiere of Pyotr Ilyich Tchaikovsky's Eugene Onegin; she also appeared in the world premiere of Antonín Dvořák's The Jacobin.

References
Nejedlý Zdeněk: Opera Národního divadla do roku 1900, Praha 1935

1869 births
1946 deaths
Czech operatic sopranos
Musicians from Prague
19th-century Czech women opera singers
20th-century Czech women opera singers